Cheese is a GNOME webcam application, i.e. an application to handle UVC streams over Video4Linux. It was developed as a Google Summer of Code 2007 project by Daniel G. Siegel. It uses GStreamer to apply effects to photos and videos. It can export to Flickr and is integrated into GNOME.

It was officially added to GNOME in version 2.22.

Overview
The webcam application started off as a way to take photos with a webcam, which could then easily be shared. It has gained features and usage and can now be used in many ways that were not possible at its first release. Cheese can record photos as well as video, and can use a timer before shooting as well as taking pictures in burst mode. Version 2.28 brought the ability to switch between multiple webcams with one click. The application has built-in sharing so that photos or videos can be uploaded to photo-sharing sites or used on a computer. It also has many different effects that can be applied to photos.

Effects
 Mauve
 Noir/Blanc
 Saturation
 Hulk
 Vertical Flip
 Horizontal Flip
 Shagadelic
 Vertigo
 Edge
 Dice
 Warp

See also

 Comparison of webcam software
 Guvcview

References

External links

 
 

Camera software
Free communication software
Free software programmed in Vala
GNOME Core Applications
Software that uses GStreamer
Video software that uses GTK
Webcams